Fred W. Bateman (September 18, 1916 – January 10, 1999) was a Newport News Circuit Court judge and a Democratic member of the Senate of Virginia in the 1960s.

Early life and education
Bateman was a native of Roper, North Carolina, and a graduate of Wake Forest University and the law school at the University of North Carolina.  He joined the U.S. Navy as a commissioned officer after the Japanese attack on Pearl Harbor in 1941. Bateman served as a line officer on ships in the South Pacific throughout World War II.

Legal and political career
At the conclusion of the war, Bateman moved to Richmond, Virginia, in 1947 and then, in 1952, to Warwick County (which later became Newport News).  He practiced law the firm of Newman, Allaun and Downing.

Bateman was elected to the Senate from the 31st Senatorial District in 1959, and after redistricting, from the 30th District, serving until 1968. He  was a member of the Senate Finance, Courts of Justice, and Transportation Committees.

In 1981, Bateman was elected by the legislature to be a judge of the Newport News Circuit Court, retiring at the age of 72.  He continued to serve as a substitute judge for many years.

Bateman died on January 10, 1999, and the Virginia General Assembly passed Senate Joint Resolution Number 564 (1999) honoring his service and acknowledging his death.

References

 

1916 births
1999 deaths
People from Washington County, North Carolina
Politicians from Newport News, Virginia
Democratic Party Virginia state senators
Wake Forest University alumni
University of North Carolina School of Law alumni
United States Navy officers
20th-century American lawyers
20th-century American judges
20th-century American politicians
United States Navy personnel of World War II
Virginia circuit court judges